The Tasmania Women cricket team, also known as Tasmanian Tigers and previously Tasmanian Roar, is the women's representative cricket team for the Australian State of Tasmania. They play their home games at Blundstone Arena, Hobart. They compete in the Women's National Cricket League (WNCL), the premier 50-over women's cricket tournament in Australia. They previously played in the now-defunct Australian Women's Twenty20 Cup and Australian Women's Cricket Championships.

History

1906–1984: Early history
Tasmania's first recorded match was against Victoria on 17 March 1906. A second match against Victoria was also recorded on 23 March 1906. Their next recorded match did not take place until 27 December 1979, when they played Victoria Women's Cricket Association President's XI.

1985–1991: Australian Women's Cricket Championships
Tasmania joined the Australian Women's Cricket Championships for the 1985–86 season. Their first match was a loss to South Australia by an innings and 124 runs. Tasmania failed to win a match and finished bottom of the table. Tasmania made further appearances in the Australian Women's Cricket Championships in 1987–88 and 1990–91, finishing bottom both times. They also appeared in the Women's Australian Under-21 Championships in 1985/86 and 1986/87.

2009–present: Twenty20 Cup and Women's National Cricket League
Tasmania joined the Australian Women's Twenty20 Cup as Tasmanian Roar for the 2009–10 season, finishing bottom of the table. They joined the WNCL for the 2010–11 season, but again finished bottom. Tasmania's best finish in the Twenty20 Cup came in its final season, 2014–15, when they finished fourth. They finished third in the WNCL in 2018–19 and 2020–21. They won their first WNCL title in 2021–22, topping the group stage before beating South Australia in the final by 9 wickets. They defended their title in 2022–23, again beating South Australia in the final.

On 4 June 2018, Cricket Tasmania announced that the name of the team would change to the Tasmanian Tigers, aligning their branding with the men's team.

Grounds
Tasmania's first recorded home match against Victoria Women's Cricket Association President's XI was played at the North West Tasmania Cricket Association Ground in Burnie. Since 2008, when they started to play regular matches, Tasmania have predominantly used Blundstone Arena (formerly Bellerive Oval) in Hobart. They have also used other grounds in Hobart such as Lindisfarne Oval, New Town Oval, the TCA Ground, Kingston Beach Oval and Kingston Twin Ovals. Outside Hobart, they have also played occasional matches at NTCA Ground and York Park, both in Launceston.

Both of Tasmania's home matches in the 2019–20 WNCL were played at the TCA Ground. They played three 2020–21 WNCL home games at Blundstone Arena and two at Kingston Twin Ovals, whilst in 2021–22 and 2022–23 they only used Blundstone Arena for their home matches.

Players

Current squad
Based on squad announced for the 2022/23 season. Players in bold have international caps.

Notable players
Players who have played for Tasmania and played internationally are listed below, in order of first international appearance (given in brackets):

 Kim Fazackerley (1992)
 Julia Price (1996)
 Mel Jones (1997)
 Isobel Joyce (1999)
 Rachel Priest (2007)
 Amy Satterthwaite (2007)
 Elyse Villani (2009)
 Julie Hunter (2010)
 Heather Knight (2010)
 Sarah Coyte (2010)
 Lizelle Lee (2013)
 Hayley Matthews (2014)
 Naomi Stalenberg (2016)
 Alex Hartley (2016)
 Molly Strano (2017)
 Belinda Vakarewa (2017)
 Nicola Carey (2018)
 Celeste Raack (2018)
 Erin Burns (2019)
 Heather Graham (2019)

Coaching staff
 Head coach: Salliann Beams
 Assistant coach: Dan Marsh
 Assistant coach: Alex Pyecroft
 Assistant coach: Clive Rose
 Female Pathway Coach: Natalie Schilov
 Physiotherapist: Emily Khalfan
 Strength & Conditioning Coach: Ross Brosnan

Honours
Australian Women's Cricket Championships:
Winners (0):
Best finish: 7th (1985–86, 1987–88, 1990–91)
Women's National Cricket League:
Winners (2): 2021–22 & 2022–23
Australian Women's Twenty20 Cup:
Winners (0):
Best finish: 4th (2014–15)

See also
Cricket Tasmania
Tasmania men's cricket team
Hobart Hurricanes (WBBL)

References

 
Australian women's cricket teams
Cricket in Tasmania
Sporting clubs in Tasmania